Marijn Poels is a Dutch independent filmmaker, documentary filmmaker and international speaker. His feature films include The Uncertainty Has Settled, Paradogma, and he has also made several TV documentary series. Poels' films address international social, economic and political issues.

Biography
In 2009 Poels wrote his first book, Between Two Worlds.

Poels' film style features real-life recordings, so that the viewer gets a relatively unfiltered view of reality without being directly fed an opinion by the filmmaker.

In 2017 Poel's produced the documentary The Uncertainty Has Settled, in which he questions the consensus on anthropogenic climate change and current energy policies. This film is part of a trilogy. In a sequel to this film, Paradogma, he investigates the toxic state of the current public debate and explored themes such as polarisation, conformism and intolerance. In the third part, Return to Eden, Poels returns to climate change and agriculture. This film asks the question to what extent humans are part of nature and where the boundaries lie in the urge to regulate climate change, nature and our food supply.

In 2022, Poels produced the film Pandamned, where he discusses societal changes during the COVID-19 pandemic.

Politics 
In 2013, Poels produced the documentary Pablo, about the social cleansing ahead of the 2014 FIFA World Cup in Brazil. In January 2014, the documentary was screened at the Dutch Parliament. In response to the screening, the Christian Democratic Appeal and the Dutch Labour Party asked parliamentary questions about the violations of human rights ahead of the World Cup.

Recognition and awards 

In 2011, Poels received the "Voice of Peace” medal in Lahore, Pakistan. This medal is annually awarded to persons who committed their selves against terrorism and violence in Pakistan and coming out for human rights.
The cultural award "Heart for culture" was awarded to Poels in September 2015 by the municipality of Horst aan de Maas. The jury asks attention for people or groups who are involved in culture in an inspirational way.

Film awards 
 2011: Dody Spittal Award - Calgary - Picture This Film festival - The Voice of 650 Million Times One
 2015: NL Award - Netherlands - Twee levens in een hart
 2015: Audience Award - Warsaw Poland - Human Doc Filmfestival - Change From Within
 2015: Golden Award - Los Angeles USA - Independent Film Awards -Ageless Friends
 2016: Best Documentary - New York City USA - Direct Short Film festival -Ageless Friends
 2016: Dody Spittal Award and Honorable Mention - Calgary - Picture This Film festival - Change From Within
 2017: Best documentary - Berlin - Berlin Independent Film Festival - The Uncertainty Has Settled
 2017: Best documentary - Los Angeles - Mindfield Film Festival - The Uncertainty Has Settled

Filmography

External links
 
 

Living people
Dutch documentary filmmakers
People from Horst aan de Maas
Year of birth missing (living people)